Valeriy Yurchuk (born 12 April 1990) is a Ukrainian professional footballer who plays as a goalkeeper for SC Dnipro-1.

Career
Yurchuk is a product of the FC Dnipro Youth Sportive School System. His first trainers were Oleksiy Chystyakov and Serhiy Maksymych.

He made his debut for Metalurh Zaporizhzhia in the Ukrainian Premier League in a match against FC Zorya Luhansk on 24 May 2015.

References

External links

Ukrainian footballers
1990 births
Living people
Footballers from Dnipro
Ukraine student international footballers
FC Dnipro-2 Dnipropetrovsk players
FC Dynamo Khmelnytskyi players
FC Dnipro Cherkasy players
FC Metalurh Zaporizhzhia players
NK Veres Rivne players
FC Naftovyk-Ukrnafta Okhtyrka players
SC Dnipro-1 players
Association football goalkeepers
Ukrainian Premier League players